Cedar Breaks National Monument is a U.S. National Monument located in the U.S. state of Utah near Cedar City. Rising above the rim is the prominent Brian Head, the peak of which lies a short distance outside of the National Monument boundary.

The rock of the amphitheater is more eroded than, but otherwise similar to, formations at nearby Bryce Canyon National Park, Red Canyon in Dixie National Forest, and select areas of Cedar Mountain (SR-14). Because of its elevation, snow often makes parts of the park inaccessible to vehicles from October through May. Its rim visitor center is open from June through October. Several hundred thousand people visit the monument annually. The monument area is the headwaters of Mammoth Creek, a tributary of the Sevier River.

Flora and fauna 
Wildlife can often be seen in this high altitude setting. Mule deer and porcupines are common, as are rodents and similar animals such as marmots, golden-mantled ground squirrels, pocket gophers, and chipmunks. Mountain lions and other larger animals live in the area but are seldom seen. Common birds include the Clark's nutcracker, violet-green swallows, and the common raven.

The bristlecone pine, a species of tree that is known as the longest living single organism, can also be found in the high country, with some local specimens known to be more than 1600 years old. Subalpine meadows dot the canyon rim in such areas as Alpine Pond, which is an easy hike from the road along a clear trail. Aspen, Engelmann spruce, subalpine fir trees, and limber pine also grow here.

Spring begins in June at this elevation, when wildflowers cover the canyon rim. Wildflowers bloom all during the short growing season, and visitors can enjoy Colorado columbine, scarlet paintbrush, subalpine larkspur, pretty shooting star, orange sneezeweed, Panguitch buckwheat, prairie smoke, silvery lupin, yellow evening primrose, shrubby cinquefoil, Parry primrose, plantainleaf buttercup, and two species of Penstemon.

History and geology 

The amphitheater, located near the west end of the Colorado Plateau, covers the west side of the Markagunt Plateau, the same plateau that forms parts of Zion National Park. Uplift and erosion formed the canyon over millions of years, raising and then wearing away the shale, limestone, and sandstone that were deposited at the bottom of an ancient lake, known as Lake Claron, about 60 million years ago. It continues to erode at a pace of about  every 5 years. Atop the plateau, much of the area is covered by volcanic rock known as tuff, formed during cataclysmic eruptions around 35 million years ago.

The rocks of the eroded canyon contain iron and manganese in various combinations, providing brilliant colors that led Indians to call it the Circle of Painted Cliffs.  Iron oxides provide the reds, oranges and yellows, while manganese oxides provide shades of purple. The color of the rock is soft and subtle compared to the hoodoos at Bryce Canyon.

The area is a form of badlands—canyons, spires, walls, and cliffs so steep and confusing that the land, while of great aesthetic value, is of little utilitarian worth. Early settlers called them badlands or breaks and created the current name by combining breaks with cedar for the many juniper trees (often incorrectly called cedars) that grow in the area.

Cedar Breaks National Monument was established in 1933. A small lodge designed by Gilbert Stanley Underwood and built and operated by the Utah Parks Company once existed near the south end of the monument, but it was razed in 1972. The Cedar Breaks Lodge was the smallest of the park lodges in the Southwest. It was deemed "uneconomical to operate" by the Park Service, but protests associated with its demolition caused the Park Service to re-examine its policies concerning lodges in other parks, contributing to their preservation.

Climate

According to the Köppen climate classification, the area has a dry-summer subalpine climate (Dsc).

Attractions 
There are two well-advertised hiking trails in the monument, and a campsite near the canyon rim.

National park proposal 
In 2006, Iron County officials considered a proposal for legislation to expand the monument and rename it Cedar Breaks National Park.  The new park would include the adjacent Ashdown Gorge Wilderness, some private land and nearby Flanigan Arch.

Gallery

See also 
 List of national monuments of the United States
 Panguitch Lake
 Dixie National Forest

References 

 Cedar Breaks 1987 park brochure
 Alpine Trail brochure

External links 

 NPS: official Cedar Breaks National Monument website

 
Rock formations of Utah
Landforms of Iron County, Utah
Badlands of the United States